The lituus spiral is a spiral in which the angle  is inversely proportional to the square of the radius .

Its points of inflexion are at

The curve was named for the ancient Roman lituus by Roger Cotes in a collection of papers entitled Harmonia Mensurarum (1722), which was published six years after his death.

Coordinate Representations

Polar Coordinates 
The representations of the lituus spiral in polar coordinates  is given by the equation...

Cartesian Coordinates 
With this conversion we get the parametric representations of the curve

These equations can in turn be rearranged in such a way that an equation consisting solely of terms with 𝑥 and "𝑦" is created, which describes the lituus spiral:

Derivation of the equation in Cartesian Coordinates 

 Divide  by : 
 Solve the equation of the Lituus spiral in polar coordinates: 
 Substitute : 
 Substitute :

Geometrical Properties

Curvature 
The Curvature of the lituus spiral can be determined using the formula

.

Arc Length 
In general, the arc length of the lituus spiral cannot be expressed as a closed-form expression, but the arc length of the lituus spiral can be represented as a formula using the Gaussian hypergeometric function:

Tangential Angle 
The tangential angle of the lituus spiral can be determined using the formula

.

References

External links
 
 
 Interactive example using JSXGraph
 
 https://hsm.stackexchange.com/a/3181 on the history of the lituus curve.

Spirals
Plane curves